Nick Cannon is the debut album by American rapper Nick Cannon. It features the song "Gigolo" that reached number 9 on the US Billboard Hot Rap Songs chart and number 24 on the Hot 100 in 2004.

Critical reception

AllMusic editor Andy Kellman praised the first half of the album for containing guest contributions from producers and featured artists that help elevate Cannon as a credible artist but felt the second-half needed said contributions to make it memorable, concluding that "[A]s an MC, he has all the charisma necessary to be a venerable pop-rapper, but it's going to be a while before he can be in complete control." Jon Caramanica, writing for Rolling Stone, also praised the record's production on tracks like "Feelin' Freaky" and "Get Crunk Shorty" but found Cannon unconvincing in his lyrical delivery about the opposite sex on "My Rib" and "Gigolo", concluding that "he only proves that bravado needs to be earned, not splashed on like cheap cologne." Kathi Kamen Goldmark of Common Sense Media described the album as being "hip-hop lite", praising the production and star-studded contributions throughout the track listing, and singled out both "Whenever You Need Me" and "I Owe You" for having "surprising moments of sentimental tenderness."

Track listing

Sample credits
"Get Crunk Shorty" samples "Goin' On a Holiday" performed by Labelle, and written by Nona Hendryx.
"Whenever You Need Me" samples "Love Is the Answer" performed by The Stylistics, and written by Luigi Creatore, Hugo E. Peretti and George David Weiss.
"You" contains a portion of "The Message" performed by Grandmaster Flash and the Furious Five, and written by Clifton Chase, Edward Fletcher, Melvin Glover and Sylvia Robinson.
"Attitude" contains a portion of "Jam on It" written by Maurice Benjamin Cenac.
I Owe You" samples "Can't We Fall in Love Again" performed by Phyllis Hyman, and written by Peter Ives and John Lewis Parker.
"Your Pops Don't Like Me (I Really Don't Like This Dude)" samples "Big Ole Butt" performed by LL Cool J, and written by James Tood Smith and Dwayne Emil Simon, and "More Bounce to the Ounce" performed by Zapp, and written by Roger Troutman.

Charts

References

2003 debut albums
Nick Cannon albums
Jive Records albums
Albums produced by Just Blaze
Albums produced by R. Kelly
Albums produced by Sean Combs
Albums produced by Trackmasters